Petar Stojanović may refer to:

 Petar Stojanović (composer) (1877–1957), Hungarian-born Serbian violinist and composer
 Petar Stojanović (footballer) (born 1995), Slovenian football player